Il Giornale di Vicenza is an Italian newspaper published in Vicenza, Italy.

The newspaper, which was first published in 1915 as La Provincia di Vicenza and has since been the leading one in Vicenza and its province, is controlled by Athesis SpA (which notably controls also L'Arena, Verona's main newspaper) and, as of 2020, is edited by Luca Ancetti.

References

External links
 Official website

1915 establishments in Italy
Daily newspapers published in Italy
Italian-language newspapers
Publications established in 1915